PS Princess Wales may refer to:

  a Tyne-built passenger vessel sailing between Belfast and Fleetwood
  a Clyde-built passenger vessel sailing between Harwich, Rotterdam and Antwerp

Ship names